Sunnyside North Beach is a clothes-optional beach located at Mount Eliza, Port Philip Bay, in the State of Victoria, Australia. It is designated as a legal nudist beach under the Nudity (Prescribed Areas) Act 1983. It is the only clothes-optional beach on the east side of Port Philip Bay.

About the beach 

It is a calm beach south of Mount Eliza and an approximate 10 minute drive from Frankston.

There are signs at both ends of the beach therefore the exact legal nude area can be easily identified. As the beach is on Port Philip Bay high tides are not a concern and ample beach area is available at all times.

There are no lifesavers patrolling this beach at any time.

How to get there 
This beach is south of Moondah Beach and north of Bidwell Beach. The beach immediately next to the car park at the end of Sunnyside Road is not the legal nude beach. 
 
Access to the legal nude section is from the right side of the car park which is approximately 500 meters from the start of the nude beach. The walk north can be either along a winding dirt path through the scrub or along the beach which has a rocky section to navigate. Regulars to the beach maintain a path by clearing rocks and using concrete to make it well defined and accessible at all times.

Alternatively, a longer scenic walk from the car park at the end of Kunyung Road heading south along Moondah Beach is an option.

Parking 
There is a small sealed carpark at the end of Sunnyside Road. There is also parking along Sunnyside Road however this street has long lengths of No Parking sections near the beach thus requiring a lengthy walk from where cars can be parked. Royston Court off Sunnyside Road is strictly no parking.

The number of parking places is inadequate as this is the only legal nude beach in Port Philip Bay and is very popular on hot days. The Mornington Peninsula council are actively discouraging use of this beach by increasing the amount on No Parking areas. This beach is over zealously patrolled and parking infringement notices are issued regularly.

Facilities 
There are toilets and showers located next to the car park and free electric barbeques at the far end of the carpark.

Gallery

See also
Point Impossible Beach, a clothing-optional beach located near Torquay
Southside Beach, another clothing-optional beach located near Torquay

References

External links
Australian Nude Beaches on Google Maps

Nude beaches
Beaches of Victoria (Australia)
Mornington Peninsula
Port Phillip